José Antonio González may refer to:

 José Antonio González (cyclist) (born 1946), Spanish former road bicycle racer
 José Antonio González (racewalker) (born 1976), Spanish Olympic athlete
 José Antonio González Anaya (born 1967), Mexican politician
 José Antonio González i Casanova (1935–2021), Spanish lawyer and politician
 José Antonio González Caviedes (1938–1996), Spanish politician
 José Antonio González de Salas (1588–1654), Spanish humanist and writer
 José Antonio González Estrada (born 1995), Spanish association football player

See also 
 José González (disambiguation)